The Catholic University of Korea St. Vincent's Hospital (가톨릭대학교 성빈센트병원) is a medical center in Suwon, South Korea. The number of beds is 900. Hospital is used in the 2010 TV series Master of Study.

See also
 List of hospitals in South Korea

References

External links
The Catholic University of Korea St. Vincent's Hospital

Catholic University of Korea
Buildings and structures in Suwon
Hospitals in South Korea